Prijezda Kotromanić may refer to:

 Prijezda I Kotromanić, medieval ruler (ban) of Bosnia (1250–1287)
 Prijezda II Kotromanić, medieval ruler (ban) of Bosnia (1287-1290)

See also
Stephen Kotromanić (disambiguation)
Tvrtko Kotromanić (disambiguation)
List of rulers of Bosnia